The 2005–06 Winthrop Eagles men's basketball team represented Winthrop University in the 2005–06 NCAA Division I men's basketball season. The Eagles, led by head coach Gregg Marshall, played their home games at the Winthrop Coliseum in Rock Hill, South Carolina, as members of the Big South Conference. The Eagles won the Big South Conference regular season title, and won the 2006 Big South tournament, earning an automatic bid to the NCAA tournament as the 15th seed in the Washington, DC Bracket. Winthrop was beaten by second-seeded Tennessee in the first round, 63–61, on a last-second basket by Tennessee's Chris Lofton.

Roster 

Source

Schedule and results

|-
!colspan=12 style=|Regular season

|-
!colspan=12 style=| Big South Tournament

|-
!colspan=12 style=| NCAA Tournament

Source

References

Winthrop Eagles men's basketball seasons
Winthrop
Winthrop
Winthrop Eagles men's basketball
Winthrop Eagles men's basketball